Ficus hederacea is a climbing fig species, in the family Moraceae, which can be found in the Himalayas, southern China and Indo-China.  In Vietnam it may be called sung leo.  No subspecies are listed in the Catalogue of Life.

References

External links 
 

hederacea
Flora of Indo-China